Cochrane Airport may refer to:

 Cochrane/Arkayla Springs Airport in Cochrane, Alberta, Canada
 Cochrane Aerodrome in Cochrane, Ontario, Canada
 Cochrane Water Aerodrome in Cochrane, Ontario, Canada
 Cochrane Airfield in Cochrane, Chile

See also 
 Cochran Army Airfield